Talal Qureshi is a Pakistani record producer, singer, songwriter, and DJ.

Life and career
Talal Qureshi was born on 2 April 1988 in Riyadh, Saudi Arabia. Qureshi came across the video game MTV Music Generator on PlayStation which pushed him to start writing music at the age of 13. Later his family moved to Karachi, Pakistan. He released his first single "Phase Shift" in 2007. In 2012, he released his debut EP "Equator".

In 2013, He released his second EP x1988.

2014
In 2014 Qureshi released the single "Too Much To Handle" and his remix of Mooroo's "Tasveer".

2015
In 2015, Qureshi formed SNKM with Adil Omar and the duo released "Nighat & Paras", played at SXSW and various cities in the US and then collaborated and performed with Diplo and Elliphant for their first ever Pakistan show in 2016.

2016 
SNKM debuted at Mad Decent Block Party 2016 alongside Diplo, Kesha, Marshmello and others and continued to play shows through until 2018 with Major Lazer, Skrillex and others.

Qureshi also produced a new single with Faris Shafi titled "Jawab De", a socially conscious rap song that focuses on the issues of military overreach, religious extremism, patriarchy and their resulting consequences of violence against disenfranchised civilians, minorities and women in Pakistan. The resulting controversy caused the song to be censored on media, despite receiving positive reviews.

2018 

In 2018, Qureshi released the single "AAG" with Punjabi folk singer Naseebo Lal and also co-produced 3 tracks off of Adil Omar's debut album Transcendence which included "Discovery", a collaboration with Rancid front man Tim Armstrong.(

Qureshi has also appeared on BBC live sessions, featuring Faris Shafi

2019 
In 2019 Qureshi, released "Mad Calls" with California based singer "Rehma"

2020 
In 2020, Qureshi released his single featuring the versatile Natasha Noorani, who showcases her knack for crafting a turn of phrase, and Summer is full of them. “We are more than blunders” sticks out, and the shrug with which she sings “wouldn’t even mind if we don’t survive” is perfect. And although there are the occasional clunky lines – “spite inlaid with contrasting insecurities” – Noorani manages to beat these syllables into the shape of the melody, and so even these somehow work. Qureshi’s production is, as usual, stellar, melding alternative pop and RnB to great effect. Bouncy synths, groovy percussion, and pitch-shifted vocals result in a weird but mesmerizing summer jam.

In 2020, Qureshi released two EP's "Acha Vol.1 and Vol.2"

In 2020, Qureshi released LSD featuring Shamsher Rana - A bassline that seems to sing, synth textures that reverse soon after they're played, morphed vocals, sudden downpours of melodic runs and arpeggios, brass-hooks and a driving beat – Islamabad producers Talal Qureshi and Shamsher Rana pick a joy-radiating sonic palette and dial its effects to eleven with the composition on their collaborative track 'LSD'.

2021 - Present 
Talal released the single "PAISA" featuring R&B, Pop Singer Songwriter - Hasan Raheem. Released alongside a playful music video created by Arham Ikram and RohanYV, the vibrant track boasts a spirited trap-inspired beat, genre-bending chords which lays the foundation for Raheem’s slick multi-lingual delivery.

Discography

EP's
 Equator (2012)
 x1988 (2013)
 Castle Of Hybrid Senses (2019)
 ACHA Vol.1 (2020) ACHA Vol.2 (2020)

Singles
 2023: JADU with Towers
 2022: Next 11 - Pakistan Junior League Official Anthem 2022 with Young Stunners & Justin Bibis
 2022: Vitamin D with Faris Shafi
 2022: HUM with Faris Shafi
 2022: Faltu Pyar with Hasan Raheem & Natasha Noorani
 2022: Peechay Hutt with Hasan Raheem & Justin Bibis
 2022: SHAAM with Maanu, Towers & Mujju
 2021: Cricket Khidaiye with Atif Aslam & Faris Shafi
 2021: SWEETU with Hasan Raheem & Maanu
 2021: HICO with Maanu
 2021: 5 AM with Maanu
 2021: PAISA feat. Hasan Raheem
 2020: LSD with Shamsher Rana
 2020: Constant Summer feat. Natasha Noorani
 2020: Nobody Predicted the Galaxy Would Be So Lonely
 2020: Frequency
 2020: All The Flavors You've Been Missing
 2019: Mad Calls with REHMA
 2019: Natural
 2019: Owww
 2018: Talal Qureshi feat. Naseebo Lal – Aag
 2017: After Party (feat. REHMA) 
 2017: Coconut Paradise

References

Pakistani electronic musicians
Pakistani DJs
People from Islamabad
Musicians from Islamabad
Living people
Pakistani record producers
Electronic dance music DJs
Year of birth missing (living people)
Pakistani expatriates in Saudi Arabia